The European Chips Act (ECA), also known as simply the Chips Act, is a legislative proposal by the European Commission to encourage semiconductor production in the European Union.

First announced in February 2022, the Commission intends through the ECA to reclaim market share from the dominant Taiwan Semiconductor Manufacturing Company. and reduce European exposure to supply chain risks. The ECA is part of a "Chips for Europe" investment plan which will span at least until 2030, and aims to establish Europe as "a leader in this market", according to president of the European Commission Ursula von der Leyen. The proposal has three "pillars":
research, development and innovation
a new state aid exemption covering semiconductor manufacturing, and
measures to monitor the supply chain and intervene if necessary.

As of 2022, Europe accounts for less than 10 percent of the production of semiconductors worldwide, and the Commission hopes to increase the figure to 20 percent with a 43 billion euro investment. However, the initiative's association with trade protectionism has also been criticised by some writers.

See also 
 CHIPS and Science Act
 Artificial Intelligence Cold War

References

External links 
 European Commission Chips Act proposal announcement
 Proposal for a REGULATION OF THE EUROPEAN PARLIAMENT AND OF THE COUNCIL establishing a framework of measures for strengthening Europe's semiconductor ecosystem (Chips Act) on EUR-Lex
 Procedure 2022/0032/COD on EUR-Lex
 Procedure 2022/0032/COD on ŒIL

2022 in law
2022 in the European Union
Draft European Union laws
Policies of the European Union
European Union regulations